Toombul Shopping Centre was a suburban shopping centre located in the locality of Toombul which is part of Nundah, a suburb of the City of Brisbane in the state of Queensland, Australia. The centre was anchored by Target and Kmart discount department stores, Coles supermarket,  Aldi Food Store, an 8-screen Event Cinema and more than 140 specialty stores including Daiso.

The centre opened on 11 October 1967 by The Westfield Group. Over the years it had been remodelled from its original form with several extensions, the most recent being a new dining and entertainment precinct upgrade on the second level. Toombul was the largest shopping centre on Brisbane's northside until Westfield Chermside's redevelopment in 1999-2000.

The centre experienced severe damage due to flooding in February 2022, and a decision has been made to not reopen the shopping centre.
Business owners have been receiving letters informing them "it is impractical and undesirable to reinstate the centre to how it was prior to the flooding damage".

"As a result, to provide our retailers with certainty we have taken the difficult decision to close Toombul Shopping Centre and terminate all leases," the correspondence said.

History

In the mid 1960s, The Westfield Group was looking to expand interstate into Queensland. Co-founder of Westfield, Frank Lowy sent his brother John and an engineer to the state to scout for potential sites in Brisbane. A local real estate agent, Donald Petrie, showed them the current site, located on a flood plain with a creek flowing through it in a growing area of the city.  Later, the Westfield founders travelled to Brisbane to inspect the site. Realising the commercial potential of the area, the company purchased the property. To overcome the flooding issues, Westfield employed experts at a local university to develop a plan. The solution was to fill and raise one half of the site to build the centre and construct a bridge across the creek. 

There were also problems finding a department store to anchor the centre and filling the specialty retail spaces at the centre. As Toombul was close to the Chermside Shopping Centre, which was anchored by a department store, other department stores were cautious about opening so close. Another problem was Westfield was an unknown developer outside of New South Wales, making it hard to attract retailers. Frank Lowy and Donald Petrie resorted to walking the streets of Brisbane's CBD to find retailers to occupy the centre. It paid off as the centre was 100% leased at opening. Due to Westfield's relationship with Coles (having built some Coles stores in Sydney), the retailer was committed from the beginning of the development to opening a store at the centre.

The centre opened as Westfield Shopping Town Toombul on Wednesday 11 October 1967. It was originally anchored by a Barry and Roberts Department store, Coles supermarket, Bayards store and 60 specialty stores. It was the first shopping centre in Brisbane built with air-conditioning (Chermside was converted in 1965) and had off-street parking for up to 1500 vehicles. One of its main features was a water fountain  previously located within the current western entrance.

By the early 1970s, the Bayards store had closed down leaving room for another anchor to open at the centre. Westfield had negotiated a deal with David Jones to open a store at Toombul. This was an unusual move for the retailer at the time as they had their own development and construction company and only opened suburban stores in their own 'Garden City' shopping centres. The 2 level David Jones department store opened in 1972 and was the first extension for the centre. It was also the first David Jones store to open in a Westfield owned shopping centre.

For a brief time in the 1970s, Toombul was anchored by 2 Department stores, a rarity for an Australian shopping centre at the time. Sometime in the 1970s a single screen cinema opened at the centre, the second extension to the centre. By the mid 1970s, Barry and Roberts had closed down their Toombul store, leaving David Jones as the sole department store anchor. In 1978 the discount department store chain Target had opened a store in part of the former Barry and Roberts store. A food court was also opened at this time.

A street and 2 residential blocks adjoining the centre were bought in the late 1970s and construction of the third major extension began. In 1980, the extension opened with a new mall, bus station, extension to the second level of David Jones, Best & Less and Kmart discount department store. The total number of specialty stores at the centre increased to over 140. In 1982, the Target store closed down and was replaced by McDonnell & East two years later, giving the centre two department stores once again. McDonnell & East closed in 1987 due to its over-expansion strategy leaving David Jones, Kmart and Coles as the anchors. The fourth major extension opened in 1989 on the part of the site occupied by the former Barry and Roberts store. The extension added a BI-LO supermarket and new specialty stores on the lower level and an 8 screen hoyts multiplex cinema the 1st in not in the city plus a new food court and Sizzler restaurant on the upper mezzanine level. The rest of the centre was refurbished along with this extension.

The 1990s were probably Westfield Toombul's last successful decade, and by the early 1990s, it was the largest shopping centre on Brisbane's northside and the only centre on the northside with a multiplex cinema. The number of specialty stores at the centre totalled over 180. The centre held this title until 1999 when the redeveloped Westfield Chermside opened. Although the now much larger Chermside centre didn't greatly affect the retail trade of Toombul, it did affect the trade of the cinema. The more modern, larger 16 screen Birch, Carroll and Coyle multiplex with Gold Class cinemas and entertainment precinct built at Chermside drew much of its clientele from the same catchment area as the Toombul multiplex, with many preferring to go to Chermside. After the redevelopment of Chermside completed in 2000, Toombul became overlooked by Westfield, with the company preferring to focus on promoting the upgraded Chermside centre.

In 2003, the external facade was modernised, a new bus station constructed and an outdoor dining precinct was added where the former bus station was located. The famous "big T" sign, first erected on centre's opening in 1967, was dismantled. This was the last construction work done by Westfield. In July 2003, the centre was acquired by the Centro Properties Group in a stock trade deal involving Toombul and other Westfield properties in exchange for Centro's interest in the AMP Shopping Centre Trust. As a result, the centre changed its name from Westfield Toombul to Centro Toombul.

In 2005, Centro announced a 2-stage extension to the centre. The first stage added an Aldi Food Store, Fresh Life fresh food mall and additional specialty stores. The second stage of expansion (which never commenced) was to add Diner's Life food court on the ground level and convert the old cinemas into a rooftop carpark. This stage was originally intended to be complete by November 2006.

Around this period, the future of the centre looked uncertain, due to increased competition from rival centres at Chermside, Nundah and Brisbane Airport, as well as due to the aging superstructure of the building itself.  Much of the blame for the decline, even while the surrounding area is booming, has been laid at the feet of Centro citing poor management practices.

On 21 August 2008, it was announced that Centro Toombul was for sale.

On 20 July 2010, David Jones announced that it would terminate its lease at Centro Toombul ending the store's 35-year-long relationship with the centre. The store space was taken over by discount department store Target after David Jones closed on 29 January 2011.

In May 2011, a new small food court opened on the ground level near centre court. The new food court houses 5 outlets including a Subway.

On 6 October 2011, Target opened at Toombul. The 6,574 square metre store features the full suite of Target’s new store design which includes a co-ordinated women’s fashion area with a major boulevard for accessories, a beauty shop in the middle of the store with a cosmetics bar for makeovers and a state of the art home entertainment department.

In August 2012 the 8-Screen Multiplex Cinema reopened with new furnishings (after closing in 2007). It was operated by Event Cinemas.

In November 2013, the centre was re-branded to 'Toombul' to reflect the rebranding of Centro Properties Group as Federation Centres in January 2013.

In June 2015, the former Bilo store (Also known briefly as the 2nd Coles store) closed leaving only one full supermarket in the centre.

In March 2016 it was announced that a new format Bunnings will open first half 2017 in Coles/Bilo's old position.

In May 2016 the centre was acquired by Mirvac. Mirvac's short term plans for the centre include improvements to the car parks convenience and enhancing the retail offering to better align with changing trade area demographics. Medium to long term plans include the potential to deliver a new entertainment offering and dining precinct.

In November 2019, Upstairs Toombul opened. Upstairs Toombul is a 4500sqm dining precinct situated on level 2 (where the old foodcourt/Lincraft was located) anchored by an Archie Brothers and over 12 new dining establishments. This opening also coincides with other upgrades around the centre including the Fashion mall, the Kmart Mall, the food court, the fresh food market as well as introduction of many new tenancies.

On 27 February 2022 during the 2022 Brisbane floods when torrential rain fell for three consecutive days over south-east Queensland, the entire precinct was inundated. The whole shopping centre closed due to the flooding with no date known for when it would reopen. In May 2022 it was announced by owner Mirvac that all leases were to be terminated as it was uneconomical to return the centre to its previous state. The shopping centre therefore is now permanently closed.

Brisbane Times revealed State MP Tim Nicholls met with Mirvac senior management in August 2022. This led to Mirvac saying it would "allow the community to have their say in several months after it made a decision over the future of the site". In this article, Nicholls noted the need for a "substantial retail component" in that the inner Northside is "not serviced by a decent-sized shopping centre from the CBD until Chermside". On 15 September 2022, the 4BC Breakfast Show with Neil Breen confirms that "retail space will be rebuilt at the site. Previously, they had only said it would be considered". This development will also include public open space and flood mitigation strategies. This will go out to public consultation in the coming months, after considerable public pressure.

References

External links
 Toombul website
 Westfield Group Detailed History (Contains information about the development of Toombul)

Shopping centres in Brisbane
Defunct shopping malls
Former Westfield centres in Australia
Shopping malls established in 1967
Nundah, Queensland
Toombul, Queensland
1967 establishments in Australia